Artur Jarosław Zasada, born 5 June 1969 in Zielona Gora, Poland, is a politician, he is part of the local government of Zielona Gora and a Member of the European Parliament. He is a member of Poland Together and the European Conservatives and Reformists group, having been elected for Civic Platform.

Biography 

A lawyer by the profession, graduated from the University of Wrocław. He was employed in PP and Ministry of Communications. Later he worked as a manager for international relations and marketing specialist in a transport company, then he became branch director of the Totalizator Sportowy.

At the end of the 80s he belonged to the opposition Movement for Independent Youth. In the early 90s worked in the police force. Since 1993 he was active in the National Union of Christian and in the years 2001–2002 in the Covenant Right. With them he joined the Law and Justice party, but at the turn of 2003 and 2004 he decided to occur in the party, then he joined the Civic Platform .

In 2006, elected councilor from Civic Platform list in Zielona Góra. In the city council he was a chairman of the Committee on Budget and Finance and the club of Civic Platform councilors. In 2008 he became a member of the Regional Council of Civic Platform. In 2009 European Parliament election in Poland he was elected and became MEP, candidating from the second place in the list of Civic Platform Gorzów County and receiving 25 875 votes. August 30, 2013 he decided to suspend for three months his membership in the Civic Platform as a gesture of solidarity with two members of the party in Polish Parliament (Jarosław Gowin and Jacek Żalek)  who were punished for breaking party group discipline. November 15, 2013 he announced the withdrawal from the structures of the Civic Platform and started to being involved in the ”Godzina dla Polski” movement, created by Jarosław Gowin after his departure from PO.

In the European Parliament he sits on the Committee on Transport and Tourism.

References

Bibliography 
 Profile on the European Parliament website
 Biography note on the europarlament.pap.pl

External links 
 Artur Zasada – private website

1969 births
Living people
People from Zielona Góra
MEPs for Poland 2009–2014
Civic Platform politicians
Law and Justice MEPs
European Conservatives and Reformists MEPs
Poland Together MEPs